Severo Cominelli (11 November 1915 – 20 April 1998) was an Italian professional football player. Considered one of the best footballers in Atalanta's history.

References

1915 births
1998 deaths
Italian footballers
Serie A players
Serie B players
Atalanta B.C. players
Inter Milan players
S.P.A.L. players
Association football midfielders
S.G. Gallaratese A.S.D. players